Víctor Aspillaga (born 2 July 1985) is a Peruvian rower. He competed in the men's single sculls event at the 2012 Summer Olympics.

References

External links
 

1985 births
Living people
Peruvian male rowers
Olympic rowers of Peru
Rowers at the 2012 Summer Olympics
Sportspeople from Lima
20th-century Peruvian people
21st-century Peruvian people